Woldemariam (Ge'ez: ወልደ ማርያም meaning “child of Mary”) is a male given name of Ethiopian and Eritrean origin may refer to:

Ambaye Wolde Mariam (1906–1954, in Keren Eritrea), Ethiopian Foreign Minister in 1953
Mesfin Woldemariam (born 1930), Ethiopian peace activist and philosopher
 Million A. Woldemariam, shooting victim
Selam Woldemariam (born 1954), Ethiopian guitarist
Woldeab Woldemariam (1905–1995), Eritrean politician active in the Eritrean independence movement
Yosef Wolde-Mariam, founder of Norwegian dance/hip hop duo Madcon

See also
Wolde (disambiguation)

Ethiopian given names
Amharic-language names